Saint Gerald of Sauve-Majeure (sometimes also Gerard or Geraud) ( 1025–1095), also known, from his place of origin, as Gerald of Corbie, was a Benedictine abbot.

Life
Saint Gerald was born in Corbie, Picardy, and was educated at the abbey of Corbie, where he later became a monk and cellarer. He suffered greatly from violent headaches which prevented him from carrying out his devotions. In an effort to cure them he made a pilgrimage with his abbot to seek the intercession of Saint Michael at Monte Gargano and that of Saint Benedict at Monte Cassino. While at Rome he was ordained by Pope Leo IX. On his return he was healed of the severe headaches by the intercession of Saint Adalard, a former abbot of Corbie, of whom Gerald wrote a hagiography.

He later made a pilgrimage to Palestine, after which he was elected abbot of St. Vincent's Abbey, Laon, but the monks did not accept his authority or the imposition of proper discipline. After some five years he resigned from Laon in order to become abbot of St. Medard's Abbey, Soissons, but was driven out by an usurper.

He then sought instead to found a new Benedictine monastery. Duke William VIII of Aquitaine gave him a huge tract of forest in the Gironde near Bordeaux, where Gerald founded the abbey of Grande-Sauve, of which he was also the first abbot. This developed into a powerful community for the advancement of the Benedictine Rule and mode of life, with significant influence from the customs of Cluny. Gerald began the practice of celebrating mass and the Office for the Dead for 30 days after the death of a community member. His constant advice to his monks for as long as he lived was that they should shun all discussion. He died at Grande-Sauve Abbey.

Veneration
He was canonized on 27 April 1197 by Pope Celestine III. His feast day is 5 April.

See also

References

Sources
 Saints.SQPN.com
 Saint of the Day, April 5  at SaintPatrickDC.org
  Katolsk.no

1020s births
1095 deaths
People from Somme (department)
French Benedictines
French abbots
11th-century Christian saints
Medieval French saints
Corbie Abbey